John E. Foley (April 19, 1939 – November 29, 2020) was an American professional basketball player for the Boston Celtics and New York Knicks of the National Basketball Association (NBA). He was selected in the second round as the 18th pick in the 1962 NBA Draft by the Celtics and spent one season playing in the league. Foley was given the nickname "The Shot" because of his explosive offensive ability.

A native of Worcester, Massachusetts, Foley attended Assumption High School, where he graduated in 1958. He decided to stay close to home when playing college basketball and enrolled at the College of the Holy Cross. Since college freshmen were ineligible to participate on varsity teams, Foley's college career did not officially begin until 1959–60. In his three seasons as a Crusader, he scored so many points that his nickname, "The Shot", was what he was commonly referred to. In his sophomore season, Foley averaged 24.6 points per game (ppg), followed by 26.9 ppg and 33.3 ppg during his junior and senior seasons, respectively. In his senior year of 1961–62, he finished second in the nation in scoring behind Utah's Bill McGill (38.8 ppg). That season, Foley garnered consensus Second Team All-American honors. In addition to his high season scoring averages, Foley also put up big single game numbers. He is the record holder of the two highest scoring games in school history—56 points against Connecticut in 1962 and 55 against Colgate in 1960—as well as having scored 40 or more points five times in his career. Foley became the first player in school history to score 2,000 career points, and his 2,185 points was the most in school history until the early 1980s.

Foley's professional career was not spectacular, especially compared to his college career. He then played in six games for the Knicks and averaged 3.5 points. For his career, Foley scored 53 points, grabbed 16 rebounds and recorded 5 assists.

Following his basketball career, Foley became a high school teacher and girls' basketball coach. He died from Parkinson's disease on November 29, 2020, at his home in Worcester.

References

1939 births
2020 deaths
All-American college men's basketball players
American men's basketball players
Basketball coaches from Massachusetts
Basketball players from Worcester, Massachusetts
Boston Celtics draft picks
Boston Celtics players
Forwards (basketball)
High school basketball coaches in Massachusetts
Holy Cross Crusaders men's basketball players
New York Knicks players
Parade High School All-Americans (boys' basketball)